The 1954 World Fencing Championships were held in Luxembourg City, in southern Luxembourg.

Medal table

Medal summary

Men's events

Women's events

References

World Championships
World Fencing Championships, 1954
History of Luxembourg City
Fencing Championships
Sports competitions in Luxembourg City
World Fencing Championships
Fencing competitions in Luxembourg
1950s in Luxembourg City